Vestigial-like family member 3 is a protein that in humans is encoded by the VGLL3 gene.

References

Further reading